Notoliparis is a genus of fish in the family Liparidae found in the Atlantic, Pacific and Southern Ocean.

Species
There are currently 5 recognized species in this genus:

 Notoliparis antonbruuni Stein, 2005 (Anton Bruun's snailfish)
 Notoliparis kermadecensis (J. G. Nielsen, 1964) (Kermadec snailfish)
 Notoliparis kurchatovi Andriashev, 1975 (Kurchatov's snailfish)
 Notoliparis macquariensis Andriashev, 1978 (Macquarie snailfish)
 Notoliparis stewarti Stein, 2016 (Stewart's snailfish)

References

Liparidae
Marine fish genera
Taxa named by Anatoly Andriyashev